Acleris nigriradix is a species of moth of the family Tortricidae. It is found in China, Korea, Japan and the Russian Far East (eastern Siberia).

The wingspan is 20 mm for males and 19 mm for females.

References

Moths described in 1931
nigriradix
Moths of Asia